Line Beauchamp (born February 24, 1963) is a Canadian politician. She served as the Liberal Member of the National Assembly (MNA) for the Sauvé riding, and for Bourassa-Sauvé at the Quebec National Assembly from November 30, 1998 to May 14, 2012.
She also served as Minister of Culture and Communications from April 29, 2003 to April 18, 2007, Minister of Sustainable Development, Environment and Parks from April 18, 2007 to August 12, 2012, and served as Minister of Education, Recreation, and Sports from August 11, 2010, and as Deputy Premier of Quebec from September 7, 2011, until she resigned on May 14, 2012 as a result of the 2012 Quebec student strike.

In January 2013, she founded her strategic consulting company and took on a variety of contracts with clients from an array of sectors including culture, education, real estate, and professional services. She is also a guest columnist for Le Journal de Montréal.

Born in Valleyfield, Line Beauchamp earned a BAC in psychology from Université de Montréal in 1985. From 1984 to 1985, she worked as a teaching assistant in that same institution and in 1987 became the Director of Info-croissance, a consumer protection association dealing with psychotherapy, self-help, and cults. From 1991-1993 Line Beauchamp worked as Executive Director for the 101,5 CIBL-FM radio station. In 1993, she became the Executive Director for Pro-Est, the society for the promotion and socio-economic partnerships of Montreal East, until 1998. Between 1989 and 1998, Line Beauchamp was a member of several executive committees, including the l'Association coopérative d'économie familiale du Centre de Montréal (ACEF) from 1989 to 1993, the Corporation de développement de l'Est (CDEST) from 1993-1997, Collège de Maisonneuve from 1995 to 1998, and the Régie des installations olympiques (RIO) from 1996-1998, in addition to being a member of the Réseau des gens d'affaires de l'Est from 1993 to 1998.

In 2013 and 2014 she was a member of the Executive Committee for Maisonneuve-Rosemont Hospital, Rivière-des-Prairies Hospital's Fondation les Petits Trésors, Fondation Père-Ménard, Zoofest and Mondial des jeux.

Political career 
During the 1998 Quebec general election, Line Beauchamp won the Sauvé riding. Elected under the banner of the Quebec Liberal Party, she thus became a member of the official opposition, with the Parti Québécois in power (the Lucien Bouchard and Bernard Landry government). She was the Official Opposition Critic in matters of culture and communications. She was also one of the ministers tasked with leading diplomatic missions in Belgium, Catalonia and Europe.

Re-elected during the 2003 elections, Line Beauchamp became the Minister of Culture and Communications on April 29, 2003, following the election of the Quebec Liberal Party. As of February 18, 2005, she also became the minister responsible for the Montreal region.

In the weeks before the 2007 election, Line Beauchamp was named Director of the Quebec Liberal Party electoral campaign. The day of the election, she took home a third victory in her riding. A little over three weeks later, she was named Minister of Sustainable Development, Environment, and Parks.

During the August 2010 cabinet shuffle, she became the Minister of Education, Recreation, and Sports, replacing Michelle Courchesne, who joined Treasury Board. On September 7, 2011, following the resignation of Nathalie Normandeau, Line Beauchamp became the 15th Deputy Premier of Quebec.

During the spring of 2012, while serving as the Minister of Education, Recreation, and Sports, she was at the heart of the student strike against raising tuition fees. This strike was the longest student strike in the history of Quebec. The student crisis caused her to resign from her position as MNA for Bourassa-Sauvé, as Minister of Education, Recreation, and Sports, and as Deputy Premier of Quebec on May 14, 2012, after 13 weeks of protests. During a press conference she stated that she was "no longer part of the solution", and that the gesture was her "ultimate compromise" to resolve the crisis.

Electoral record (incomplete)

References

External links
 

1963 births
Women government ministers of Canada
Deputy premiers of Quebec
Living people
Members of the Executive Council of Quebec
People from Salaberry-de-Valleyfield
Politicians from Montreal
Quebec Liberal Party MNAs
Université de Montréal alumni
Women MNAs in Quebec
21st-century Canadian politicians
21st-century Canadian women politicians